In mathematics, the Cauchy–Hadamard theorem is a result in complex analysis named after the French mathematicians Augustin Louis Cauchy and Jacques Hadamard, describing the radius of convergence of a power series. It was published in 1821 by Cauchy, but remained relatively unknown until Hadamard rediscovered it. Hadamard's first publication of this result was in 1888; he also included it as part of his 1892 Ph.D. thesis.

Theorem for one complex variable
Consider the formal power series in one complex variable z of the form

where 

Then the radius of convergence  of f at the point a is given by

where  denotes the limit superior, the limit as  approaches infinity of the supremum of the sequence values after the nth position.

Proof
Without loss of generality assume that .

First suppose . Let  not be  or 
For any , there exists only a finite number of  such that . 
This proves the first part.

Theorem for several complex variables

to the multidimensional power series

The proof can be found in

Notes

External links

Augustin-Louis Cauchy
Mathematical series
Theorems in complex analysis